A water jacket is a water-filled casing surrounding a device, typically a metal sheath having intake and outlet vents to allow water to be pumped through and circulated. The flow of water to an external heating or cooling device allows precise temperature control of the device.

Applications
Water jackets are often used for water cooling or heating. They are also used in laboratory glassware: Liebig, Graham, and Allihn condensers. Water jackets were used to cool the barrels of machine guns until several years after the First World War, but modern machine guns are air-cooled to conserve weight and hence increase portability.

In a reciprocating piston internal combustion engine the water jacket is a series of holes either cast or bored through the main engine block and connected by inlet and outlet valves to a radiator.

Equipment such as tissue culture incubators may be enclosed in a water jacket kept at a constant temperature.

See also 
 Jacketed vessel

References 

Cooling technology